Decavitator is a human-powered hydrofoil equipped with pedals and an air propeller that was built by the Massachusetts Institute of Technology. It holds the human-powered speed record on water. The vehicle was displayed hanging in the entry lobby of the Museum of Science, Boston until 2015. It is currently in storage at MIT.

In the spring of 1993 the Decavitator team was awarded the DuPont prize for the team with the fastest speed on record as of 31 December 1992.

See also 
 Human-powered hydrofoil
 Human-powered watercraft
 Hydrocycle
 List of world records in rowing
 Pedalo
 Speed with Guy Martin

References 

Hydrofoils